Border Counties Bridge was a 19th-century railway bridge across the River Tyne just west of Hexham, Northumberland, England. The bridge used to carry the Border Counties Railway over the River Tyne at Border Counties Junction with the Newcastle and Carlisle Railway.

History
The Border Counties Railway was authorised by Parliament in 1854.

The bridge was beset with problems from its construction when the temporary wooden structure erected initially to allow a crane access, was swept away by floods. The abutments at the south end had to be moved eastwards to avoid scouring of the river at its original site. Both weight and speed restrictions have always been a feature of the bridge. The bridge was reportedly damaged by floods in August 1948 and was given temporary repairs sufficient to keep the line open for a time.

The condition of the bridge was a major factor in the eventual closure of the line, the cost of repairs being considered prohibitive. Regular passenger trains ceased on 13 October 1956 although the line (and the bridge) remained open for goods traffic until 1 September 1958.

The bridge was demolished in 1959. Today, the remains of the piers can still be seen in the river.

References

Railway bridges in Northumberland
Crossings of the River Tyne
Former railway bridges in the United Kingdom